is a Japanese film from 1977 directed by Junya Satō, starring George Kennedy and Yūsaku Matsuda. It was produced by Haruki Kadokawa.

Plot
A young black man from New York named Johnny Hayward (Joe Yamanaka) receives a sum of money.  He buys new clothes and takes a flight to Japan.  After he arrives, he is found fatally stabbed in a lift in a Tokyo hotel at the same time as a fashion show by designer Kyōko Yasugi (Mariko Okada) is being held.  The police department, including Munesue (Yūsaku Matsuda) and his partner (Hajime Hana), come to investigate.  The only clue is the dying man's last words "straw hat".  At the same time, a woman having an extramarital affair, Naomi (Bunjaku Han), is accidentally run over by Yasugi's son (Kōichi Iwaki).  He and his girlfriend dump her body in the sea, but drops his watch at the scene.  He is haunted by his actions and confesses to his mother, Kyōko, who suggests he flee to New York with his girlfriend.

Munesue starts to suspect that Kyōko knows more than she is letting on.  He travels to New York to find out more about the dead man.  There he is partnered with American detective Ken Shuftan (played by George Kennedy), who seems to be the same man who killed Munesue's father.  Munesue finds that the young man is the son of a black American soldier and a Japanese woman.  He also finds Yasugi's son, who deliberately provokes Shuftan into shooting him dead.  Munesue returns to Japan and begins to suspect Kyōko.  He travels to a resort and discovers that Kyōko was a prostitute in the years after the war.  Finally he has enough evidence and confronts Kyōko that Johnny was her mixed-race son, and she killed him to protect her reputation.  Kyōko commits suicide.  In America, Shuftan goes looking for the Johnny's father and finds he is dead.  Then Shuftan is stabbed and dies.

Cast
George Kennedy - Shuftan
Yūsaku Matsuda - Munesue
Mariko Okada - Kyōko Yasugi
Bunjaku Han - Naomi (woman run over)
Joe Yamanaka - Johnny Hayward
Janet Hatta
Toshiro Mifune - Yasugi's husband
Robert Earl Jones - Willy Hayward, Johnny's father
Broderick Crawford - Shuftan's superior in the police force
Rick Jason - Lionel Adams
Kōichi Iwaki - Yasugi's son
Takeo Chii - Detective Kusaba
Hiroyuki Nagato - Naomi's husband
Kōji Wada : Kawanishi
Hajime Hana - partner
Junzaburō Ban - onsen owner

Reception
The film was the second highest-grossing film of all time in Japan with theatrical rentals of $15 million.

Music

The theme song, entitled Ningen no Shōmei no Tēma, with the line "Mama, do you remember" was a chart hit for Joe Yamanaka, selling 517,000 copies, and reaching number 2 on the Oricon chart in Japan. It was also a hit in other Asian countries. In Chinese speaking countries the song is called Old Straw Hat, taken from lyrics in the song.

Television remake
In 2004, the movie was remade as a 10 episode mini-series for Fuji TV. Though the basic premise was maintained, the story was greatly expanded to include many additional characters and subplots. A number of details were also altered, such as Kyoko being a famous author turned political candidate rather than a fashion designer, and Johnny being from Mississippi rather than New York. The series also featured a different, more optimistic ending, with Kyoko being arrested and convicted for her crimes, Shuftan dying in the line of duty while defending a young black boy from an attacker, and Munesue continuing his career as a detective.

Cast
 Yutaka Takenouchi as Ichiro Munesue
 Bo Svenson as Ken Shuftan
 Yui Natsukawa as Kiriko Motomiya
 Keiko Matsuzaka as Kyoko Koori
 Sousuke Takaoka as Shohei Koori
 Ren Osugi as Atsushi Yokowatari
 Nao Matsushita as Michiko Asaeda
 Seiichi Tanabe as Tomoya Saeki
 Maki Horikita as Sayaka Koori
 Hiroyuki Ikeuchi as Johnny Hayward

References

External links

Films directed by Junya Satō
Japanese films set in New York City
Tokyo Metropolitan Police Department in fiction
Films scored by Yuji Ohno
English-language Japanese films
1970s Japanese-language films
Foreign films set in the United States